This is a list of Australian composers of classical music, contemporary music and/or film soundtracks.

These names are largely drawn from the following:
 Music Australia an online service developed by the National Library of Australia (NLA) and the National Film and Sound Archive (NFSA);
 Australian Music Centre's (AMC) list of "Represented artists";
 lists entitled "Australian Composers" and "Australian Repertoire" published by Australian Choral Conductors Education and Training (ACCET);
 the "Catalogue of Australian Organ Compositions 1866–2002" published by the Organ Historical Trust of Australia (OHTA);
 the "Australian Composers" list;
and various other websites and media sources.

Wherever possible, dates of birth and death are shown. The pseudonyms used by some composers are listed along with a reference back to their legal name. Entries are cross-referenced to one or more sources to provide further information.

A

 Roy Agnew (1891–1944)
 David Ahern (1947–1988)
 Hugo Alpen (1842–1917)
 Ernie Althoff (born 1950)
 John Henry Antill (1904–1986)
 Albert Arlen (1905–1993)
 Martin Armiger (1949–2019)
 Keith Asboe (born 1929)

B

 Tony Backhouse (born 1947)
 Don Banks (1923–1980)
 David Banney (born 1967)
 Michael Barkl (born 1958)
 Alison Bauld (born 1944)
 Betty Beath (born 1932)
 Ross Bolleter (born 1946)
 Anne Elizabeth Boyd (born 1946)
 George Frederick Boyle 
 Philip Bračanin (born 1942)
 May (or Mary) Hannah Brahe (1884–1956) 
 Hooper Brewster-Jones (1887–1949)
 Michael Brimer (born 1933)
 Brenton Broadstock (born 1952)
 Amanda Gabrielle Brown (born 1965)
 Colin Brumby (1933–2018)
 Vera Buck (1903–1986)
 Thomas (Tom) Edward Bulch (1860–1930)
 Warren Burt (born 1949)
 Nigel Butterley (1935–2022)

C

 John Carmichael (born 1930)
 Ann Carr-Boyd (born 1938)
 Jeff Cashen
 Tristram Ogilvie Cary (1925–2008)
 Nick Cave (born 1957)
 Herbert Hedwan Chandler (1865–1941).
 Charles Cawthorne (1854–1925)
 Alice Charbonnet-Kellermann (1858–1914)
 Charlie Chan (born 1966)
 Arthur Chanter (1886–1950)
 Deborah Cheetham (born 1964) 
 David Chesworth (born 1958)
 Andrew Chubb (born 1975)
 Zana Clarke (born 1965)
 Judith Clingan (born 1945)
 George H. Clutsam (1866–1951)
 Julian Cochran (born 1974)
 Percy Code (1888–1953)
 Barry Conyngham (born 1944)
 Herbert Cosgrove (died 1953)
Vince Courtney (died 1951)
 Kate Crawford
 Ian Cresswell (born 1968)
 Ian Cugley (1945–2010)
 Leah Curtis
 Cesare Cutolo (1826–1867)

D

 Robert Davidson (born 1965)
 Ruby Claudia Davy (1883–1946)
 Brett Dean (born 1961)
 George De Cairos Rego (1858–1946)
 George Savin De Chanéet (1861–1926)
 John Albert Delany (1852–1907)
 Herbert De Pinna (1880–1936)
 Matthew Dewey (born 1984)
 Joe Dolce (born 1947)
 Paul Doornbusch (born 1959)
 George Dreyfus (born 1928)
 Jon Drummond (born 1969)
 Catherine Duc

E

 Ross Edwards (born 1943)
 Frederick Ellard (1824–1874)
 Warren Ellis 
 Harry Lindley Evans (1895–1982)
 Winsome Evans (born 1941)

F

 Billy Field (born 1953)
 Mary Finsterer (born 1962)
 Thomas Fitzgerald
 Samantha Fonti (born 1973)
 Andrew Ford (born 1957)
 Riccardo Formosa (born 1954)
 Grant Foster (born 1945)
 Jennifer Fowler (born 1939)
 Edwin Fowles (1871–1945)

G

 Lisa Gerrard (born 1961)
 Helen Gifford (born 1935)
 Richard Gill (1941–2018) 
 Paolo Giorza (1832–1914)
 Peggy Glanville-Hicks (1912–1990)
 Isador Goodman (1909–1982)
 Eugene Goossens (1893–1962)
 Christopher Gordon (born 1956)
 Tony Gould
 Paul Grabowsky (born 1958)
 Ron Grainer (1922–1981)
 George Percy Aldridge Grainger (1882–1961)
 Sally Greenaway (born 1984)
 Stuart Greenbaum (born 1966)
 Maria Grenfell (born 1969)
 Eric Gross (1926–2011)

H

 Gordon Hamilton (born 1982)
 Ronald Hanmer (1917–1994)
 Raymond Hanson (1913–1976)
 Ian Keith Harris (born 1935)
 Fritz Bennicke Hart (1874–1949)
 Mick Harvey (born 1958)
 Fiona Joy Hawkins (born 1964)
 Christian Heim (born 1960)
 Christian Helleman (1880–1954)
 Moya Henderson (born 1941)
 Laurence Henry Hicks (1912–1997)
 Francis Hartwell Henslowe (1811–1878)
 Moritz Heuzenroeder (1849–1897)
 Alfred Francis Hill (1869–1960)
 Matthew Hindson (born 1968)
 David Hirschfelder (born 1960)
 Dulcie Sybil Holland (1913–2000)
 Alan Holley (born 1954)
 Wilfrid Holland (1920–2005)
 Charles Edward Horsley (1822–1876)
 Robert Watson Hughes (1912–2007)
 Frank Hutchens (1892–1965)
 Miriam Beatrice Hyde (1913–2005)

J

 William Garnet James (1892–1977)
 Graham Jenkin (born 1938)
 Alan John (born 1958)
 Anthony Linden Jones (born 1959)

K

 Elena Kats-Chernin (born 1957)
 Donald H. Kay (born 1933)
 Norman Kaye (1927–2007)
 Horace Keats (1895–1945)
 Paul Kelly (born 1955)
 Paul Kenny (born 1969)
 Frederick Septimus Kelly (1881–1916) 
 Gordon Kerry (born 1961)
Henry John King (1855–1934)
Ashley Klose
 William Robert Knox (1861–1933)
 Douglas Knehans (born 1957)
 Julian Knowles (born 1965)
 Graeme Koehne (born 1956)
 Constantine Koukias (born 1965)
 Henry Krips (1912–1987)

L

 Lynette Lancini (born 1970)
 Brenton Langbein (1928–1993)
 Guglielmo Enrico Lardelli (1857–1910)
Louis Lavater (1867–1953)
 Lê Tuấn Hùng (born 1960)
 Stephen Leek (born 1959)
 Dorian Le Gallienne (1915–1963)
 John Lemmone (1861–1949)
 Georges Lentz (born 1965)
 Liza Lim (born 1966)
 Carl (or Karl) Ferdinand August Linger (a.k.a. Charles Linger) (1810–1862)
 Michael Lira (born 1975)
 Alexander Frame Lithgow (1870–1929)
 Jonathan Little (born 1965)
 William Lovelock (1899–1986)
 David Lumsdaine (born 1931)
 Jack Lumsdaine (1895–1948)

M

 Mary Mageau (1934–2020)
 Raffaele Marcellino (born 1964)
 Stephen Hale Marsh (1805–1888)
 George Marshall-Hall (1862–1915)
 Arthur Massey (composer) (1861–1950)
 John Boswell Maver (born 1932)
 Mona McBurney (1867–1932)
 John McAll (born 1960)
 Daniel Clive McCallum (born 1989)
 David McCormack
 Peter Dodds McCormick (1834?–1916)
 Brett McKern (born 1972)
 Sir William McKie (1901–1984)
 Richard Meale (1932–2009)
 Sir Jonathan Mills (born 1963)
 Richard Mills (born 1949)
 Ernest Edwin Mitchell (1865–1951)
 Kate Moore (born 1979)
 Stephen Moreno (1889–1953)
 Graeme Morton
 Ian Munro (born 1963)
 William Murdoch (1888–1942)

N

 Ronald O. Nagorcka (born 1948)
 Isaac Nathan (1792–1864)
 Mike Nock (born 1940)

O

 Sean O'Boyle (born 1963)
 Tony O'Connor (1961–2010)
 William Arundel (Bunny) Orchard (1867–1961)

P

 Charles Sandys Packer (1810–1883) 
 Frederick Augustus Packer (1839–1902)
 George Palmer (born 1947)
 Katharine "Kitty" Parker (1886–1971)
 Anthony Pateras (born 1979)
 Raimund Pechotsch (died 1941)
 James Penberthy (1917–1999)
 Michael (Mike) Perjanik
 Barrington Somers Pheloung (1954–2019)
Linda Phillips (1899–2002)

R

 Bert Rache (died 1928)
 Stephen Rae (born 1961)
 Alan Rattray
 Graeme Revell (born 1955) 
 Ruby Reynolds-Lewis (1881–1964)
 Damien Ricketson (born 1973)
 Arthur Rivers (1857–1940) 
 Sir William Robinson (1834–1897)
 John Rodgers (born 1962)
 Hermann Rosendorff (1860–1935)
 David Rumsey (1939–2017)

S

Arline Sauer
 Albert Bokhare Saunders (1880–1946)
 Andrew Schultz (born 1960)
 Peter Sculthorpe (1929–2014)
 Luscombe Searelle (1853–1907)
 Matthew Shlomowitz (born 1975)
 Thanapoom Sirichang (born 1981)
 Larry Sitsky (born 1934)
 Cezary Skubiszewski (born 1949)
 Jan Skubiszewski (born 1981) 
 Joe Slater (1872–1926)
 Roger Smalley (1943–2015)
Michael Sollis (born 1985) 
 Benjamin Peter Speed (born 1979)
 William Stanley (composer) (1820–1902)
 Reginald Alberto Agrati Stoneham (1879–1942)
 Robert James Stove (born 1961)
 Joseph Summers (1839–1917)
 May Summerbelle (1867–1914)
 Margaret Sutherland (1897–1984)

T

 Peter Tahourdin (1928–2009)
 Henry Tate (1873–1926)
 George Tibbits (1933–2008)
 Katia Tiutiunnik (born 1967)
 Richard Tognetti (born 1965)
 George William Torrance (1835–1907)
 Ernest Truman (1869–1948)
 Costas Tsicaderis (1945–2004)
 Walter J. Turner (1884–1946) 
 Joseph Twist (born 1982)

V

 Lindsay Vickery (born 1965)
 Carl Edward Vine (born 1954)
 Nicholas Vines (born 1976)
 Alexander Voltz (born 1999)

W

 Don Walker (born 1951)
 Simon Walker (1961–2010)
 Felix Werder (1922–2012)
 Martin Wesley-Smith (1945–2019)
 Fred Werner (active 1895–1912)
 Nigel Westlake (born 1958)
 Alfred Wheeler (1865–1949)
 Gillian Whitehead (born 1941)
 Stephen Whittington (born 1953)
 Christopher Willcock (born 1947)
 Malcolm Williamson (1931–2003)
 David Worrall (born 1954)

Y
 Yitzhak Yedid (born 1971)

Z
 Alberto Zelman (1832–1907)

See also
Chronological list of Australian classical composers
List of Australian women composers
 Australian Composers Ex-Copyright

References 

Composers
 
Lists of composers by nationality